State Route 133 (SR 133) is a north–south state highway in the southwestern portion of the U.S. state of Ohio.  Its southern terminus is at its interchange with U.S. Route 52 near Felicity and its northern terminus is at its interchange with SR 350 in Clarksville.

History
SR 133 was commissioned in 1923, between Chilo and Bethel. On the route of current SR 222 from Chilo to Felicity and its current route between Felicity and Bethel. In 1926 the highway was extended north to Owensville, passing through Williamsburg. The route was moved onto its current route south of Felicity in 1930, switching routes with SR 222. In that same year the route was extended north to Blanchester. On March 9, 1932 the highway was extended north to Clarksville.

Major intersections

References

133
Transportation in Clermont County, Ohio
Transportation in Warren County, Ohio
Transportation in Clinton County, Ohio